With or Without You is a 1999 British romantic drama film directed by Michael Winterbottom and starring Christopher Eccleston and Dervla Kirwan. Set in Belfast, it tells the story of a married couple trying to have children. Their efforts are interrupted when past loves re-enter their lives. The film went straight to video in the UK.

References

External links

1999 romantic drama films
1999 films
Film4 Productions films
British romantic drama films
1990s English-language films
1990s British films